Snowing is an American emo band from Lehigh Valley and Philadelphia in Pennsylvania. Composed of bassist and vocalist John Galm, guitarists Nate Dionne and Willow Brazuk, and drummer Justin Renninger, the band formed in 2008 and dissolved in 2011.

History
After the break up of Street Smart Cyclist, Galm, Dionne and Brazuk joined and formed Snowing in 2008 in Lehigh Valley and Philadelphia, while Galm worked as a movie theater projectionist with Square of Opposition Records label manager Chris Regec. The band released their first extended play, Fuck Your Emotional Bullshit, in 2009 via Square Of Opposition Records. In 2010, the band released their first and only full-length album via Count Your Lucky Stars Records and Square of Opposition Records titled I Could Do Whatever I Wanted If I Wanted.

In 2011, Snowing announced they were breaking up. In a statement released by the band on their Facebook page, they stated "Snowing has come to an end at the ripe old age of 3 and a half (that's over 90 in emo years!).... We had a blast writing songs, driving across the country playing shows, imbibing copious amounts of alcohol, and earning future grey hairs by reading all about ourselves on message boards. Thanks for everything." The band broke up following its first and only full US tour with its last ever show selling out in a matter of minutes. The band reunited in 2016 for two shows, one for the World Is a Beautiful Place & I Am No Longer Afraid to Die's Broken World Fest in Pittsburgh, the second for Square of Opposition Records' 15th anniversary. The band said that these would be their final shows. However, the band reunited in 2019 for a brief tour in Japan. Also in 2019, guitarist Brazuk made a post on the band's Facebook page announcing that she had come out as a transgender woman and changed her name to Willow.
In 2022, Snowing announced a one time reunion show at the Ukrainian American Citizens' Association (Ukie Club) for 4333 Collective's DIY Superbowl fest along with Oolong, Short Fictions, Ugli, and Lisa on August 27th, 2022. All proceeds from the show were donated to the Trevor Project and the Transgender Legal Defense Fund.

Legacy 
Snowing has been referred to as "the favourite band of your favourite emo revival bands". The band developed a cult following after their breakup during the explosion and revival of emo into its fourth wave.

Band members
John Galm - bass, vocals
Nate Dionne - guitar
Willow Brazuk - guitar
Justin "Bean" Renninger - drums

Discography
Studio albums
I Could Do Whatever I Wanted If I Wanted (2010)

EPs
Tour Tape (2009)
Fuck Your Emotional Bullshit (2009)
"Pump Fake" / "Scherbatsky" (2012)

Splits
1994! / Snowing / Boys and Sex / Algernon Cadwallader – Summer Singles (2009)
Compilations

 That Time I Sat In A Pile Of Chocolate (2016)
 Everything (2016)

References

Musical groups from Philadelphia
Musical groups established in 2008
Musical quartets
Musical groups disestablished in 2011
Musical groups reestablished in 2019
Musical groups reestablished in 2016
Count Your Lucky Stars Records artists
American emo musical groups
Emo revival groups